"Now I Can Dance" is a song written by Tina Arena and David Tyson. It was the third single taken from Arena's third studio album, In Deep (1997). It was written by Arena while she was living in Los Angeles and is a love letter from her to her family, as she explained in her autobiography. The song was successful in her native Australia, reaching number 13 on the ARIA Singles Chart.

Now I Can Dance is also the title of Tina Arena's memoir released in October 2013. In 2017, Arena updated her autobiography with the release of a new edition of Now I Can Dance, with new content covering her relocation from France back to Australia, being inducted into the 2015 ARIA Hall of Fame, the release of new music, and new musical ventures.

Music video
The video is set against a white backdrop with Arena auditioning various people for an unspecified role. Singer Charo makes a cameo in the video, playing a guitar solo.

Track listing
Australian maxi-CD single digipak
 "Now I Can Dance" (single edit)
 "Now I Can Dance" (urban radio mix)
 "Now I Can Dance" (Pee Wee's 7-inch dance mix)
 "Now I Can Dance" (Paul's Bumpy Train Ride mix)
 "Now I Can Dance" (The Endorphin mix)

Charts

Weekly charts

Year-end charts

Certifications

References

1997 songs
1998 singles
Columbia Records singles
Songs written by David Tyson
Songs written by Tina Arena
Tina Arena songs